Fritz Langner (8 August 1912 – 25 January 1998) was a German footballer and later manager.

References

External links 
 

1912 births
1998 deaths
People from Wrocław
German footballers
Association football midfielders
SC Concordia von 1907 players
German football managers
SC Westfalia Herne managers
Borussia Mönchengladbach managers
SV Werder Bremen managers
FC Schalke 04 managers
TSV 1860 Munich managers
Freiburger FC managers
VfL Osnabrück managers
1. FC Nürnberg managers